Antonio María Vicente Narciso Borrero y Cortázar (29 October 1827 – 9 October 1911) was Vice President of Ecuador from 1863 to 1864, and President from 9 December 1875 to 18 December 1876.

Antonio Borrero was born in Cuenca, Ecuador and completed much of his education in his home town. He received his law license in Quito. He served as President of Ecuador for little over a year before being overthrown in the Revolution of Veintemilla. He was exiled by Jefe Supremo (Supreme Chief) Ignacio de Veintemilla and lived for a number of years in Peru and Chile. After the overthrow of Veintemilla in 1883, he was allowed to return to Ecuador where he practiced law and worked as a journalist and writer until his death in Quito in 1911.

His administration supported free suffrage, press freedom and guarantees of individual rights. He was urged to by liberals to hold a national assembly to amend the Garciana Constitution and establish the Republic on more modern lines.

References

 ANTONIO BORRERO Y CORTAZAR. diccionariobiograficoecuador.com

1827 births
1911 deaths
People from Cuenca, Ecuador
Ecuadorian people of Spanish descent
Presidents of Ecuador
Vice presidents of Ecuador
Ecuadorian male writers
19th-century Ecuadorian lawyers